The Arboretum du Col du Las is a municipal arboretum and nature trail located in La Grande-Fosse, Vosges, Grand Est, France. The arboretum contains about 100 regional trees and shrubs planted along a botanical trail with landscape views of the Massif du Donon. It is open daily without charge.

See also 
 List of botanical gardens in France

References 
 La Grande-Fosse: Arboretum du Col du Las
 La Grande-Fosse description (French)
 L'Echo des Chênaies entry (French)
 AC Nancy Metz entry (photos)

Col du Las, Arboretum du
Col du Las, Arboretum du